The men's 74 kg freestyle wrestling competition at the 2018 Commonwealth Games in Gold Coast, Australia was held on 12 April at the Carrara Sports and Leisure Centre. Sushil Kumar from India won the gold medal and Johanes Botha from South Africa won the silver.

Results
Legend
F — Won by fall

Bracket

Repechage

References

Wrestling at the 2018 Commonwealth Games